Martinas is a given name. Notable people with the name include:

Martinas Geben (born 1994), Lithuanian basketball player
Martinas Rankin (born 1994), American football player

See also
Martina (given name)
Martinat
Martynas

Masculine given names